Bikeyevo (Bikäy) is a rural locality (a selo) in Ibragimovsky Selsoviet, Chishminsky District, Bashkortostan, Russia. The population was 494 as of 2010. There are 9 streets.

Geography 
Bikeyevo is located 32 km southeast of Chishmy (the district's administrative centre) by road. Ibragimovo is the nearest rural locality.

References 

Rural localities in Chishminsky District